Waldemar Henrici (February 3, 1878 – February 15, 1950) was a Lieutenant General of the German Wehrmacht who commanded a division of the VII Army Corps in the 4th Army during Operation Barbarossa, the German invasion of Russia during the Second World War, and also a leading figure in the Reichsarbeitsdienst.

Career

Early life and service
Henrici was born in Bensberg, Cologne, and began his military career in the Prussian Army in 1896, becoming a lieutenant in 1906 and a captain in 1911. He was attached to the Prussian War Ministry in 1914 before departing for the front lines as a major in 1916.

Inter-war years
Following the end of the war he worked for the Defence Ministry as a lecturer, reaching the rank of lieutenant colonel in 1921. He received a doctorate in political science in 1923 with a dissertation entitled "The coal industry in Russia and after the war".

Henrici commanded forces in the Reichswehr in 1932, becoming a colonel in 1925. He took command of the 2nd Prussian Infantry Regiment in Olsztyn in 1928. With the rise of Nazi Germany he became an Arbeitsgauleiter in the Reichsarbeitsdienst. In 1933 he became Secretary of State in the Ministry of Labour and later Reich Commissioner in the Freiwilliger Arbeitsdienst.

World War II
Henrici rejoined the army in 1939, and took command of the 555th Infantry Division stationed on the Rhine in 1940. He took part in the initial action against France before being sent to Poland to command the 258th Infantry Division. In 1941 he led his division in Operation Barbarossa, being promoted to lieutenant general in October 1941. He was wounded the following day and spent two months in hospital. 
After his return he became Wehrmachtbefehlshaber Ukraine (military commander of Reichskommissariat Ukraine). He went into retirement in December 1943, and died in 1950 in Marktbreit.

Notes

External links
 Waldemar Henrici from Das Bundesarchiv, Munich Historical Archives.

1878 births
1950 deaths
Military personnel from Cologne
Prussian Army personnel
People from the Rhine Province
Major generals of the Reichswehr
Recipients of the Iron Cross (1914), 1st class
Recipients of the Silver Liakat Medal
Lieutenant generals of the German Army (Wehrmacht)
Reich Labour Service members
German Army personnel of World War I
German Army generals of World War II